Joseph Cook (1860–1947) was Prime Minister of Australia 1913–14.

Joseph or Joe Cook may also refer to:

 Joseph Louis Cook (died 1814), Mohawk chief
 Joseph H. Cook (1829–1921), merchant and political figure in Nova Scotia, Canada
 Josephus Flavius Cook or Joseph Cook (1838–1901), American philosophical lecturer, clergyman, and writer
 Joseph Cook (gymnast) (1880–1964), British Olympic gymnast
 Joe Cook (actor) (1890–1959), American actor and comedian
 Joe Cook (basketball) (born 1985), American basketball coach

See also
 Joseph Cooke (disambiguation)